Forbidden Science is a science fiction television series that aired on Cinemax from January to March 2009. It is set in a near-future world in which people fulfill erotic desires with virtual reality and androids.  The 13-episode series is a combination of film noir and erotic thriller, focuses on the lives of the 4Ever Innovations staff.

Cast and characters 
 Vanessa Broze as Julia White – A clone of a brain–computer interface researcher Stephanie White; who via a memory chip from the recently deceased researcher, is able to join the staff and continue Stephanie's work.
 Levi Freeman as Colin Summers – The owner of 4Ever Innovations.
 Joanne Alderson as Bethany Montrose – Joins 4Ever Innovations as the head of sales after her marriage ends. A friend of Colin's from before the show.
 Noelle DuBois as Dr. Penny Serling – A researcher in android technology and virtual reality. She is a parody of the character Abby Sciuto on NCIS.
 Austin Ball as Dr. Philip Wise – A researcher in android technology and virtual reality. He becomes Penny Serling's lover.
 Richard Roy Sutton as Adrian Turner – A co-founder of 4Ever Innovations.
 Mary LeGault as Laura Lucas – Colin Sommers Executive Assistant and lover.

Episodes

External links

 
 

2009 American television series debuts
2009 American television series endings
2000s American science fiction television series
Androids in television
Cinemax original programming
Television series by Warner Bros. Television Studios
Erotic television series
American thriller television series
Film noir